Castle Lake is a barrier lake formed by the May 18, 1980 eruption of Mount St. Helens, when an avalanche dammed the South Fork of Castle Creek. In 1981 a spillway was constructed to alleviate concerns about sudden erosion. The lake is difficult to access, but trails have been built to it and recreational fishing is allowed.

Description
Castle Lake's outflow runs towards Coldwater Lake, another lake newly formed by the eruption. It is surrounded by precipitous ridges consisting of andesitic and dacitic volcanic bedrock.

History

The lake filled rapidly during the winter of 1980–1981, and was expected to overflow the blockage in the fall of 1982. In 1991, rainbow trout appeared in the lake, apparently resulting from the migration of stock introduced to Coldwater Lake a few years earlier. The trout of Castle Lake are a self-perpetuating population, successfully spawning in the streams that feed Castle Lake.

Recreation
Construction started in 1989 on Gifford Pinchot National Forest trail number 221, called the Castle Lake Trail. Trout fishing is seasonally accessible and allowed.

Ecological issues
There has been significant concern that despite the spillway construction, the debris blockage that created Castle Lake could erode suddenly, and create a flood posing significant risks to the communities of Castle Rock, Kelso, Longview, and Toutle.  In a study conducted by United States Army Corps of Engineers given to the United States Forest Service, the probability of such a breach was considered very low.  However, the conditions which created the dam are unprecedented, and therefore little to no historical data exists to support any conclusion regarding stability.  The blockage appears to be stable regarding overtopping erosion, but the susceptibility to earthquake or hydrologic events remains undetermined.

References

Lakes of Washington (state)
Landslide-dammed lakes
Lakes of Cowlitz County, Washington
1980 in Washington (state)
Mount St. Helens